Don Lamar Adams (November 27, 1947 – December 25, 2013) was an American professional basketball small forward.

Born in Atlanta, Adams attended Northwestern University and was selected in the 8th round of the 1970 NBA draft by the San Diego Rockets. In his NBA career, Adams averaged 8.7 points per game, 5.6 rebounds per game and 1.8 assists per game. In the ABA, Adams averaged 10.1 points per game, 5.1 rebounds per game and 3.9 assists per game.

NBA/ABA career statistics

Regular season

|-
| style="text-align:left;"| 
| style="text-align:left;"| San Diego
| 82 || – || 29.0 || .409 || – || .731 || 7.1 || 2.1 || – || – || 11.4
|-
| style="text-align:left;"| 
| style="text-align:left;"| Houston
| 3 || – || 13.7 || .316 || – || .500 || 2.7 || 1.0 || – || – || 4.3
|-
| style="text-align:left;"| 
| style="text-align:left;"| Atlanta
| 70 || – || 29.0 || .394 || – || .747 || 7.1 || 2.0 || – || – || 11.7
|-
| style="text-align:left;"| 
| style="text-align:left;"| Atlanta
| 4 || – || 19.0 || .211 || – || .875 || 5.5 || 1.3 || – || – || 5.8
|-
| style="text-align:left;"| 
| style="text-align:left;"| Detroit
| 70 || – || 25.7 || .402 || – || .784 || 6.0 || 1.6 || – || – || 9.3
|-
| style="text-align:left;"| 
| style="text-align:left;"| Detroit
| 74 || – || 31.1 || .408 || – || .761 || 6.1 || 1.9 || 1.5 || .2 || 10.3
|-
| style="text-align:left;"| 
| style="text-align:left;"| Detroit
| 51 || – || 31.1 || .403 || – || .577 || 4.8 || 1.5 || 1.4 || .4 || 5.9
|-
| style="text-align:left;"| 
| style="text-align:left;"| St. Louis
| 16 || – || 21.4 || .429 || .000 || .773 || 4.3 || 3.4 || .8 || .1 || 6.3
|-
| style="text-align:left;"| 
| style="text-align:left;"| St. Louis
| 20 || – || 36.3 || .394 || .000 || .759 || 5.8 || 4.4 || 1.9 || .4 || 13.1
|-
| style="text-align:left;"| 
| style="text-align:left;"| Buffalo
| 56 || – || 12.6 || .394 || – || .702 || 2.6 || 1.3 || .5 || .1 || 3.1
|-
| style="text-align:left;"| 
| style="text-align:left;"| Buffalo
| 77 || – || 22.2 || .411 || – || .746 || 4.8 || 1.9 || 1.0 || .2 || 7.3
|- class="sortbottom"
| style="text-align:left;"| Career
| style="text-align:left;"|
| 523 || – || 25.8 || .402 || .000 || .741 || 5.6 || 1.9 || 1.1 || .2 || 8.8

Playoffs

|-
| style="text-align:left;"| 
| style="text-align:left;"| Atlanta
| 6 || – || 31.3 || .357 || – || .696 || 6.3 || 2.0 || – || – || 9.3
|-
| style="text-align:left;"| 
| style="text-align:left;"| Detroit
| 7 || – || 36.6 || .384 || – || .571 || 7.3 || 2.9 || .9 || .1 || 9.1
|-
| style="text-align:left;"| 
| style="text-align:left;"| St. Louis
| 10 || – || 30.1 || .427 || .000 || .714 || 4.7 || 4.6 || 1.7 || 1.1 || 9.0
|-
| style="text-align:left;"| 
| style="text-align:left;"| Buffalo
| 9 || – || 13.6 || .417 || – || .857 || 3.0 || 1.4 || .2 || .0 || 4.0
|- class="sortbottom"
| style="text-align:left;"| Career
| style="text-align:left;"|
| 32 || – || 27.1 || .397 || .000 || .694 || 5.1 || 2.8 || 1.0 || .5 || 7.7

References

1947 births
2013 deaths
American men's basketball players
Atlanta Hawks players
Basketball players from Atlanta
Buffalo Braves players
Detroit Pistons players
Houston Rockets players
Northwestern Wildcats men's basketball players
Power forwards (basketball)
San Diego Rockets draft picks
San Diego Rockets players
Spirits of St. Louis players